Kambasegela is an administrative ward in the Busokelo District of the Mbeya Region of Tanzania. In 2016 the Tanzania National Bureau of Statistics report there were 7,006 people in the ward, from 12,597 in 2012.

Villages / vitongoji 
The ward has 3 villages and 12 vitongoji.

 Mbambo
 Igunga
 Ikapu
 Isyeto
 Mbambo Kati
 Kambasegela
 Iponjola
 Kanisani
 Mpanda
 Mwangumbe
 Nkuju
 Katela
 Ilopa
 Katela
 Mpata

References 

Wards of Mbeya Region